Mesalina watsonana, known commonly known as the Persian long-tailed desert lizard, is a species of sand-dwelling lizard in the family Lacertidae. The species is endemic to Asia.

Etymology
The specific name, watsonana, is in honor of "Mr. H.E. Watson" who was a Civil Officer in Pakistan.

Geographic range
Mesalina watsonana occurs in, from west to east, Iran, Turkmenistan, Afghanistan, Pakistan, and India.

Reproduction
Mesalina watsonana is oviparous.

References

Further reading
Nilson G, Andrén C (1981). "Die Herpetofauna des Kavir-Schutzgebietes, Kavir-Wüste, Iran ". Salamandra 17 (3/4): 130–146. (Mesalina guttulata watsonana, p. 138). (in German, with an abstract in English, and bilingual image captions).
Sindaco R, Jeremčenko VK (2008). The Reptiles of the Western Palearctic: 1. Annotated Checklist and Distributional Atlas of the Turtles, Crocodiles, Amphisbaenians and Lizards of Europe, North Africa, Middle East and Central Asia. Latina, Italy: Edizioni Belvedere. 580 pp. .
Smith MA (1935). The Fauna of British India, Including Ceylon and Burma. Reptilia and Amphibia. Vol. II.—Sauria. London: Secretary of State for India in Council. (Taylor and Francis, printers). xiii + 440 pp. + Plate I + 2 maps. (Eremias guttulata watsonana, pp. 389–390).
Stoliczka F (1872). "Notes on Reptiles, collected by Surgeon F. Day in Sind". Proceedings of the Asiatic Society of Bengal 1872: 85–92. ("Eremias [Mesalina] Watsonana", new species, pp. 86–87).

watsonana
Reptiles described in 1872
Taxa named by Ferdinand Stoliczka